Dayton Township is an inactive township in Cass County, in the U.S. state of Missouri.

Dayton Township was originally called Page Township; the present name is after the community of Dayton, Missouri.

References

Townships in Missouri
Townships in Cass County, Missouri